Globos was a short-lived musical cabaret project founded by music journalist/comedian Mark Trevorrow and musical partner Wendy De Waal. Globos had two top 30 hits in Australia, both of which were produced by Red Symons.

Trevorrow left the project in 1984 to pursue a comedy career as Bob Downe.

Discography

Singles

References

Australian pop music groups
Australian dance music groups
Musical groups established in 1981
Musical groups disestablished in 1984
Musical groups from Melbourne